Witold Szabłowski (born 1980, in Ostrów Mazowiecka) is a Polish journalist and author.

Biography 
Witold Szablowski was born in Ostrów Mazowiecka. He graduated from the Department of Journalism and Political Science at the Warsaw University. He has also studied political science in Istanbul.

While working as an intern at CNN Türk, he visited all of Turkey. He began his journalistic career with TVN24, one of the leading news channels of Poland. In 2006 he began working for ”Gazeta Wyborcza” and its weekly supplement “Duży Format”, becoming the youngest reporter in its team. He worked there till 2016.
Since 2018 he has been associated with “Dzień dobry TVN”, a Polish morning show broadcast. Since April 2019 on Newonce Radio he runs his radio show about traveling.

In 2006 in Malatya he was the first Pole to interview Mehmet Ali Ağca's family, the Turkish gunman who tried to assassinate Pope John Paul II. He also managed to get in touch with Oral Celik, the less famous organizer of the attack, who also shot Polish Pope.
In 2008 he won the 2007 Melchior Wańkowicz Award in the category of Inspiration of the Year for his “devotion to the best traditions of reportage – his honest documentation of aspects of Turkish society not widely known outside of the country, and his concise but vivid use of language”.

Also in 2008, he received an honourable mention from Amnesty International for the best human rights journalism – for his report on Turkish honour killings, "To z miłości, siostro" ("It's Out of Love, Sister"), which appeared in “Duży Format”. He wrote about the situation of women in Turkey who were subjected to rape and honour killing for the "sin" of wanting to decide their own fates.

In 2010 he was the first European journalist to interview Aung San Suu Kyi, the current Burmese Prime Minister, when she was released from home arrest (the one who helped him was Lech Wałęsa).
Also in this year he published his first book The Assassin From Apricot City. Reportages from Turkey (Czarne Publishing House, 2010) for which he was awarded Beata Pawlak Award, the book was also nominated for the 2011 Nike Literary Award. The English-language publication received the British PEN-Club Award, and “World Literature Today” acknowledged it to be one of the most important books translated into English the previous year.

In 2012 he received a special mention for the Anna Lindh Mediterranean Journalist Award in the press category for Let Us In, You Bastards!”, an article on the fall of Communism in Albania and on immigration from Albania to EU countries. To write the article about Albanian border jumpers, he crossed the border illegally himself. The jury chaired by French philosopher Edgar Morin, wrote: “Easy and pleasant to read, but if you read more closely, you realize that his articles are very profound”.

After a journey to Cuba, he wondered if something important had been lost in the change from communism to capitalism. He and his wife, Izabela Meyza, decided to live for the year of 2012 as if they were in Communist times. They wore clothes from Communist times, refrained from buying things not available in the Polish People's Republic, and sought out games and objects from the Communist era. Together they wrote a book about their experiences, Nasz mały PRL. Pół roku w M-3, z trwałą, wąsami i maluchem ("Our Little Polish People's Republic: Six Months in a Three-room Apartment with a Perm, a Moustache, and a Fiat 126p”)

In 2014 he published Tańczące niedźwiedzie ("Dancing Bears"), a collection of reportages about nations across Central Europe and their way to freedom, in which he writes about the creation of reserves for bears previously used as dancing bears to entertain people. He uses the experiences of the former dancing bears to explore differences between communist and capitalist systems. The book received rave reviews: The New York Times called it “a pearl” (in Orlando Figes's review) and Timothy Garton Ash (from “Foreign Affairs”) wrote: “This is a Milan Kundera remake of Dances With Wolves”. The book was called one of the best books of the year 2018 by National Public Radio (NPR), the biggest public radio network of the United States. In 2019 the book was nominated for The Edward Stanford Travel Writing Awards as the only non-English book.

In 2016  Szablowski's book Sprawiedliwi zdrajcy. Sąsiedzi z Wołynia (“Righteous Traitors. Neighbours from Volhynia”) was published. It depicts the fate of the victims and witnesses of the 1943-1944 massacres of Poles in Volhynia. Szabłowski's main focus is on Ukrainians who at great personal risk provided help to their neighbours, Polish or Jewish. The book was awarded Terena Torańska Newseek Prize in the same year and is considered some of the best reporting of the massacres of Poles in Volhynia.

In 2018 a new edition of "The Assassin From Apricot City" was published, under the new title of Merhaba (W.A.B. Publishing House) and supplemented with author's Turkish-Polish dictionary.
In 2019 his new book will be published in Poland and US, under the Polish title "Kucharze dyktatorów" (“Dictators’ Chef”). For the last 3 years he has been reaching and interviewing chefs who cooked for 20th and 21st-century autocrats. The book is a result of the interviews and the recipes he collected.

 Awards 
 Amnesty International – honourable mention for his report It's Out of Love, Sister, 2008
 Melchior Wańkowicz Award in the category of Inspiration of the Year, 2008
 European Parliament Journalism Prize for his reportage Today Two Corpses Will Float to This Place (2010)
 Nike Literary Award – nominated for The Assassin From Apricot City, 2011
 Beata Pawlak Award for The Assassin From Apricot City, 2011
 Angelus Central European Literature Award for The Assassin From Apricot City, 2011
 Anna Lindh Mediterranean Journalist Award in the press category for Let Us In, You Bastards!, 2012
 Polish Press Agency Ryszard Kapuściński Award for The House Full of Ukrainians, 2013
 British Pen Club Award for English edition of The Assassin From Apricot City, 2014
 Terena Torańska Newseek Prize for Righteous Traitors. Neighbours from Volhynia, 2016
 Edward Stanford Travel Writing Awards – nominated for Dancing Bears, 2019

 Bibliography 
 Zabójca z miasta moreli (The Assassin from Apricot City),Wołowiec, Czarne, 2010.
 Nasz mały PLR. Pół roku w M- 3 z trwałą, wąsami i maluchem (Our Little Polish People's Republic: Six Months in a Three-room Apartment with a Perm, a Moustache and a Fiat 126p– with Izabela Meyza), Kraków, Znak, 2012. 
 Tańczące niedźwiedzie (Dancing Bears), Warszawa, Agora SA, 2014.
 Sprawiedliwi zdrajcy. Sąsiedzi z Wołynia, Kraków, Znak, 2016.
 Merhaba, Warszawa, W.A.B., 2018.

 Translations Zabójca z miasta moreli English:
 The Assassin From Apricot City, transl. Antonia Lloyd-Jones, London, Stork Press, 2013.
 German
 Weil ich dich liebe, Schwester. Reportagen aus der Türkei, transl. Joanna Manc, Vliegen Verlag, 2015. 
 Wie man einen Diktator satt bekommt, transl. Paulina Schulz-Gruner, KATAPULT-Verlag, 2021.
 Russian
 Убийца из города абрикосов, transl. Madina Alekseeva, Corpus, 2015. 
 Ukrainian
 Убивця з міста абрикосів'', transl. Dzvinka Matiyash, Tempora, 2012.

References

External links 
 Excerpt from English translation of The Assassin from Apricot City.
 Stork Press article about The Assassin from Apricot City.

1980 births
Polish journalists
Living people
Polish male writers